Issam Hallaq is a senior Syrian Military Commander and Chief of Air Force Staff during the Syrian Civil War.

Hallaq has overall responsibility to the Chief of the General Staff for operations and activities of the Air Force.

References

Syrian generals
Living people
Year of birth missing (living people)